Armon is a male given name of Hebrew origin meaning "palace." It is also the name of an Israeli neighborhood in southern East Jerusalem, known in English as East Talpiot or Armon HaNetziv in Hebrew, funded in 1928 by the wife of Israel's second president Yitzhak Ben-Zvi.

Given name
 Armon Hatcher (born 1976), American football player
 Armon Watts (born 1996), American football player

See also 
 Armon (disambiguation)

References

Given names of Hebrew language origin